Dasylophus is a genus of 2 species of cuckoos in the family Cuculidae.  Both species are found in forest in the Philippines.

Species

Dasylophus
Bird genera
Taxa named by William John Swainson